No Refuge is the second studio album by singer Eddie Schwartz. It was released in late 1981 by A&M Records in Canada, and appeared on Atco in the US in early 1982.

Lead single "All Our Tomorrows" reached #32 in Canada, and #28 in the U.S. Billboard Hot 100, and was also a significant hit on the adult contemporary charts.  The followup single "Over the Line" was also a top 40 hit in Canada, peaking at #38, but didn't fare as well in the U.S., reaching #91.

The single "No Refuge" hit #40 in the U.S. Rock Tracks chart, compiled by Billboard.

Track listing
A Side

B Side

Chart performance

Album

Singles

Personnel
Credits are adapted from the album's liner notes.
Eddie Schwartz – lead vocals, guitar
David Tyson – keyboards, electronic bass
Peter Follett – guitar solos
Bob Wilson – bass
Gary Craig – drums
Dick Smith –  percussion
Jim McGrath – trumpet
Steve McDade – trumpet
John Johnson – alto and tenor saxophones
Bruce Gregg – trombone

Production team
Eddie Schwartz, David Tyson – producers
Mike Jones – engineer, mixing

References

Eddie Schwartz albums
1981 albums
A&M Records albums